The 2012 Copa Venezuela was the 43rd staging of the Copa Venezuela. The winner qualified for the 2013 Copa Sudamericana.

First round
1st legs played on 29 and 30 August 2012.
2nd legs played on 5, 11 and 12 September 2012.
Byes:
Mineros de Guayana (2011 Copa Venezuela champion)
CD Lara (2011–12 Venezuelan Primera División champion)

|}

Second round
1st legs played on 26 September 2012.
2nd legs played on 3, 10 and 11 October 2012.

|}

Quarterfinals
1st legs played on 17 October 2012.
2nd legs played on 24 and 25 October 2012.

|}

Semifinals
1st legs played on 31 October 2012.
2nd legs played on 7 and 14 November 2012.

|}

Final
1st leg played on 21 November 2012.
2nd leg played on 28 November 2012.

|}

References

External links
Official website of the Venezuelan Football Federation 
Copa Venezuela 2012, Soccerway.com

Copa Venezuela
2012–13 in Venezuelan football
2012 domestic association football cups